Kless is a surname of German origin. Notable people with the surname include:

Friedrich Kless (1906–1994), German general 
Ruby Kless Sondock (born 1926), American judge

References

Surnames of German origin